On the morning of Monday 23 May 1977, four armed South-Moluccans took 105 children and their five teachers hostage at a primary school in Bovensmilde, Netherlands. At the same time nine others hijacked a train in the nearby De Punt. Both hostage crises lasted for twenty days before being ended by military interventions.

Context
The South Moluccans had arrived in the Netherlands for a temporary stay, promised by the Dutch government that they would get their own independent state, Republik Maluku Selatan (RMS). For about 25 years they lived in temporary camps, often in poor conditions.  After these years the younger generation felt betrayed by the Dutch government for not giving them their independent state and they began radical actions to gain attention for their cause.

Developments

 09:00 23 May
When the hostage crises begins the children are forced to cover the windows with newspapers preventing the outside world from knowing what was happening inside.
 25 May
The day of the elections for the national parliament. To increase pressure on the government the children are forced to shout out of the windows: "van Agt, we want to live". The first ultimatum expires at 14:00 without any problems.  Later that day, additional demands are expressed.
 27 May
All the children are released because many children have become ill from some unknown disease.  The cause and nature of these disease is still unknown, but it is often speculated that the provided food might have been deliberately poisoned with laxatives by authorities to force a break-through, this is substantiated by a statement from Dutch Prime Minister Dries Van Agt in a Dutch documentary where he said "Ik vind het een uitstekend idee (…) een laxeermiddel hebben we allemaal wel eens nodig."[I think it's a great idea (…) everybody needs a laxative now and then.].  Four teachers were retained as hostages.
 05:00 11 June
Marines attack the school in the early morning, an armoured car and explosives punched a hole in the wall and marines entered the building. The Moluccans surrendered without a fight after hearing about the subsequent military attack on the train at "De Punt".

Aftermath
The four attackers were convicted with sentences varying from six to nine years.

The Moluccan community has never made any apologies, but two of the hostage takers, motivated by born-again Christianity, have had a meeting with former victims in 2007.

Thirty years after the events in question, on 23 May 2007, a monument was erected and the first memorial ceremony is held where symbolic white balloons were released.

See also
 Attempt at kidnapping Juliana of the Netherlands
 1975 Dutch train hostage crisis
 1975 Indonesian consulate hostage crisis
 1977 Dutch train hostage crisis
 1978 Dutch province hall hostage crisis

References

External links
 Article from 1977 Times magazine
 Article from BBC "on this day"
 Witness: Dutch school hostage crisis - 15 minute interview from 2013 with child hostage Geert Kruit.
 Dutch Polgoon television images from 1977
  Dutch Polygoon television images of the military action from 1977
 Images in the Dutch National Archive 
 Images of the memorial ceremony on May 23, 2007
 Terrorist Organization Profile: South Moluccan Suicide Commando 

School hostage crisis
1977 Dutch school hostage crisis
Hostage taking in the Netherlands
1977 Dutch school hostage crisis
Moluccan Dutch
Terrorist incidents in Europe in 1977
Terrorist incidents in the Netherlands in the 1970s